Fred Cone may refer to:

Fred Cone (baseball) (1848–1909), American baseball player
Fred Cone (American football) (1926–2021), American football player
Fred P. Cone (1871–1948), American politician